Moving Panoramas are an American indie rock band from Austin, Texas. They are signed to Modern Outsider and have released two albums on the label.

Moving Panoramas founder, guitarist, and frontwoman Leslie Sisson has worked as a crew member for Vampire Weekend. She formed the band in the wake of personal trauma. In 2011, Sisson and her boyfriend were abducted at gunpoint from her house by a man who had broken in. The assailant forced the couple to take PCP while he robbed them. She subsequently learned that her kidnapper had also killed a man and his teenage daughter.

Following the incident Sisson has reported experiencing post-traumatic stress disorder, depression, and anxiety. This was complicated by other events, such as another friend being murdered and a former roommate threatening her life.

Over the next year Sisson wrote songs and instructed her friend Rozie Castoe in playing bass. She formed the band in 2012 with Castoe and drummer Karen Skloss.. The songs inspired by her kidnapping would appear on Moving Panoramas' debut album, One in 2015. The same year, Moving Panoramas performed in the FFF Nites series at Austin's Fun Fun Fun Fest.

Over the course of 2018 the band recorded a second album with an expanded lineup and with Skloss replaced on drums by Jody Suarez and Jordan Rivell taking over as bassist. This album, In Two, was released on February 22, 2019. The same year, Moving Panoramas performed at South by Southwest.

Discography
 One (Modern Outsider, 2015)
 In Two (Modern Outsider, 2019)

References

Indie rock musical groups from Texas
Musical groups from Austin, Texas
American shoegaze musical groups